The Lions of Al-Rassan is a historical fantasy novel by Canadian writer Guy Gavriel Kay. It is set in a peninsula of the same world in which The Sarantine Mosaic and The Last Light of the Sun are set, and is based on Moorish Spain. The novel concentrates on the relationships between the three peoples: the Kindath (analogous to the Jews), the Asharites (analogous to the Muslims), and the Jaddites (analogous to the Christians), although the religions of the Kindath, Asharites, and Jaddites, as described in the novel, bear no relation to Judaism, Islam, and Christianity.

The three protagonists in the novel are from each of these three races and religions: Jehane bet Ishak, a Kindath physician in Fezana (loosely based on Rebecca of York); Rodrigo Belmonte, a Jaddite captain of a company of cavalry (loosely based on El Cid); and Ammar ibn Khairan, an Asharite poet, mercenary, and advisor to King Almalik of Cartada (loosely based on Muhammad ibn Ammar).

Plot summary

Like most of Kay's novels, this contains a large amount of political intrigue and religious strife. At the opening of the novel, the peninsula of Al-Rassan (formerly known as Esperaña when under Jaddite control) is split between three Jaddite kingdoms in the north (Valledo, Ruenda and Jaloña) and Asharite kingdoms in the south, of which Cartada and Ragosa figure most prominently in the story.  After centuries of being dominated by the Asharites, the Jaddite kingdoms are regaining their strength, while the once-powerful khalifate of Al-Rassan is divided and vulnerable.

In Fezana, a city in the north of Al-Rassan close to the borderlands with Valledo,  Jehane unwittingly prevents one of her patients, a merchant named Husari ibn Musa, from being executed by Asharite King Almalik of Cartada during a purge of Fezana's leading citizens.  By giving Husari shelter when the danger is revealed, Jehane puts her own life in danger. As a result, she flees Fezana at the same time that the Jaddite commander Rodrigo Belmonte of Valledo and his company have come to Al-Rassan for their parias gold - regular tribute given to the Jaddite kingdoms.  A different group of Valledans, led by the brother of the powerful constable of Valledo, brutally attack a village outside the walls of Fezana. Rodrigo steps in to halt the slaughter of the villagers, leading to the eventual death of the brother. As a result, Rodrigo is exiled by King Ramiro.  Rodrigo and Jehane make their way to Ragosa, to the court of King Badir.

Almalik set up the purge in Fezana to be blamed on his longtime courtier Ammar ibn Khairan. Ammar joins forces with the king's heir (also called Almalik) and assassinates the father. The new king Almalik II then exiles Ammar from Cartada and Ammar also travels to Ragosa.  Rodrigo, Ammar and Jehane are brought together in the court of King Badir, where Ammar and Rodrigo are hired as mercenaries, and Jehane as a physician. They form a close connection which forms the heart of the story. Jehane develops feeling for Ammar but sees her relationship with Rodrigo to simply be that of friends. 

The admiration of the two men for each other is obvious, as they are the 'best' each nation has to offer. However the shelter and stability they find in the wealthy and worldly city of Ragosa is threatened by events occurring far beyond the city walls.  The Jaddites begin a holy war against the Asharite kingdom of Ammuz and the Kindath city of Sorenica, in a rough parallel to the Crusades.  Clerics from Ferrieres urge the kings of the Jaddite kingdoms of Esperaña to launch their own wars of reconquest against their Asharite neighbours.  To the south of Al-Rassan, in the Majriti Desert lands, the Muwardis, who practice a stricter version of the Asharite religion, are impelled to intervene in the affairs of Al-Rassan, as much to repel the Jaddites as to cleanse the Asharite lands of their luxury-loving leaders.  Both the Jaddites and the Asharites also exhibit violent outbreaks against the Kindath.  Jehane's father, the famed physician Ishak ben Yonannon and her mother, Eliane, are rescued by Rodrigo just as a violent mob in Fezana storm the Kindath quarter with the intent of massacring its residents.  Ishak then performs an astonishing operation on Diego, the young son of Rodrigo, who has been savagely assaulted by the Muwardi.

The deep loyalties of Rodrigo Belmonte and Ammar ibn Khairan to Valledo and Cartada respectively mean that their eventual conflict becomes inevitable.   The two finally meet on the battlefield, each at the head of opposing armies. The two commanders duel and one is killed.   The story concludes with an afterword set some years in the future, which reveals firstly that the Jaddite kingdoms have recaptured Al-Rassan (mirroring the Reconquista) and eventually the identity of the victor of the duel.

Major themes
The interplay between bigotry and tolerance is a major theme of the novel.  The stories of the main characters are interwoven in such a way that each is responsible for saving the lives of persons who are loved by the others.  The surgery to save Diego Belmonte is seen as a key event:  "In this scene, the son of a Jaddite warleader is saved through an Asharite's warning and a Kindath's medical skill; it hints at the possibility of peaceful interaction among the three embattled religious groups."  The possibility of cooperation between people of different faith is glimpsed as an ideal that leads to the miraculous, in this case an extraordinary act of surgery.  It is in the Epilogue, in the Kindath city of Sorenica, rebuilt after its destruction by Jaddites at the outset of their holy war, where the possibilities of co-existence are realized.

The uses and misuses of religion for political ends are also demonstrated in the novel, with rulers and clergy using religion to manipulate the people and their leaders into desired courses of action.

The definition of civilization and the search for the attributes of a civilized society in a hard divided world is another theme of the novel.  Kay characterizes the relatively liberal and tolerant Asharite city of Ragosa or the Kindath city of Sorenica as places of civilization.  Silvenes, the capital of the former Khalifate of Al-Rassan, now ruined and largely abandoned, is seen wistfully as the symbol of civilization lost.   In contrast, the cruder Jaddite cities of Esperaña with their increasing military power and the ascetic desert communities of the Muwardi Asharites are places with fewer of the attributes of civilization.

While Kay presents war and conquest with an air of nobility and grandeur, the novel also constantly reminds the reader of the real price of war paid in bloodshed, loss and grief.

Awards
 Geffen Award (Translated Fantasy Books) nominee, 2005

References

Further reading

External links
 The Lions of Al-Rassan at Guy Gavriel Kay's Authorized Website.

1995 Canadian novels
Novels by Guy Gavriel Kay